Salo in chocolate is a Ukrainian dish, created as a joke or experiment and produced since the late 90s.

The recipe is thought to have originated in an ethnic joke about the Ukrainians' cult-like attitude towards salo, similar to the Italians' attitude towards spaghetti.

In the late 90s, Odesa Confectionery Factory started production of candies . The chocolate candies were invented as an April Fool's Day joke. They were not actually salo; they contain a regular caramel filling with a small amount of rendered fat added as a salty flavouring. Since then, the dish is available in shops and restaurants in various Ukrainian cities.

A BBC reporter called it "one of the unhealthiest snacks in the world".

See also 

Chocolate-covered bacon
Snickers salad
List of chocolate-covered foods

References 

Ukrainian cuisine